Dan Milligan is a former Canadian international lawn bowler and coach.

He won a silver medal in the fours at the 1986 Commonwealth Games in Edinburgh with Dave Duncalf, Dave Brown and Dave Houtby.

He was coach for the men's and women's team at the 1994 Commonwealth Games.

Personal life
He is a co-owner of MVP Sports and a retired Youth Centre teacher. He is also a keen curler and after moving to Cobourg, Ontario in 1990 he helped establish the West Northumberland Curling Club.

His sister Sharyl Ann is also a former Canadian international bowler.

References

Living people
Canadian male bowls players
Bowls players at the 1986 Commonwealth Games
Commonwealth Games silver medallists for Canada
Commonwealth Games medallists in lawn bowls
1953 births
Medallists at the 1986 Commonwealth Games